HU Delphini, also known as Gliese 791.2, is a star system in the constellation of Delphinus. Its apparent magnitude is 13.07. With a trigonometric parallax of 113.4 ± 0.2 mas, it is about 28.76 light-years (8.82 parsecs) away from the Solar System.
 
HU Delphini is a binary star with a well-defined period of 538.6 days. The orbit has been derived from astrometry as well as through spectral observations, although that has been difficult because of the high projected rotational velocity. It is also fairly eccentric, at 0.558.
 
Both stars in the system are red dwarfs. The primary component of the system is only 23.7% as massive as the Sun, so it is fully convective. As a result, there are frequent starspots on its surface, especially near poles. While the normal surface temperature of the primary is 3000 K, the starspots themselves are cooler: only 2700 K. It is also a flare star, the first flare been detected in August 2000. The secondary star has a mass of 11.4% that of the Sun.

See also
 List of star systems within 25–30 light-years

References

M-type main-sequence stars
Binary stars
Flare stars
Delphinus (constellation)
0791.2
Delphini, HU
J20294834+0941202